The iron-block, alloy head E family was an evolution of Mazda's xC design. It was released in June 1980 with the introduction of the first front-wheel drive Mazda Familias and Ford Lasers. Some later variants of the E5-powered Mazda Familia and Ford Laser in Japan incorporated a full-time 4WD drivetrain. All E engines were chain-driven, 8-valve SOHC. Notable features include siamesed cylinders, aluminium rocker arms and pistons, thin block walls, and single valve springs - all in the interest of reducing weight.

E1

The  E1 was found in the 1980–1985 Mazda Familia and Ford Laser. It was not replaced when the new Familia/323 appeared in 1985. The E1 was strictly intended for export markets where taxes based on engine size made this a popular alternative. It was never available in Japan, nor in North America or Australia.

E3

The larger E3 displaces  with a wider  bore and the same 9.2:1 compression ratio. It was found in the 1980–1985 Mazda Familia, Ford Laser and FWD 1981–1986 Mazda GLC. It was used until August 1994 for the Mazda Familia Van/Wagon (323) and continued until around 1997 for Ford Laser taxi fleets in Indonesia.

E5

The  E5 pushed the stroke to an undersquare  with 9.0:1 compression ratio. It was used in the 1980–1985 Mazda Familia, Ford Laser and FWD 1981–1986 Mazda GLC. It was also fitted to the rear-wheel drive Familia Cargo/323 Wagon in the mid-eighties, replacing the earlier UC engine.

E5F

The E5F was a fuel-injected variant of the E5, released in 1982 and available only in Japan.

E5S
In certain markets a twin-carburetted, high-compression (10.0:1) version exists, dubbed the E5S. Available for Mazda 323 GT and Ford Laser Sport.

E5T

The flagship turbocharged, lower-compression (8.2:1) pistons, fuel-injected and non-intercooled variant of the E5 was the E5T. Other notable advancements included an integrated knock sensor (supplied by Mitsubishi) and multi-point fuel injection as standard.

This was Mazda's first production 4-cylinder turbo engine and was found in the top-of-the-line 1982–1985 Mazda Familia XGi-R Turbo and Ford Laser S Turbo as well as the early Mazda Familia XG Turbo, XG-R Turbo and Ford Laser TX3 Turbo models.  Most of the technological features found in this engine were carried over to the later Mazda B6T.

E5T Carb

A strange carburettor turbocharged version of the E5 was the E5T Carb. It was exclusively available in Australia as part of the White Lightning Ford Laser limited-edition package of just 300 cars released in June 1985. The engine started out as a normal E5S and then an IHI RHB52 turbocharger was fitted, setup in a blow-through style, with boost limited to just . A modified version of the stock carburettor known as a "Solex 32 DIS (turbo)" was fitted to provide fuelling. A Compuspark ignition system with knock sensor was also added to prevent engine damage if the driver ever used a lower octane fuel than the 97 RON that was recommended. As the carburettors were not boost referenced, they were difficult to maintain and often suffered from float rupture or excessive flooding. Unlike its more reliable fuel-injected counterpart, the E5T carb turbo setup was notoriously difficult to maintain and some cars had the turbo systems removed instead of having them replaced.

See also
 Mazda engines

References

External links
 

E
Straight-four engines
Gasoline engines by model